Jerome Tanner (aka Lex T. Drill, Lex Drill, Jerry Tanner) is a pornographic film  producer/director.

Awards
1987 AVN Award – Best Director (Video) – Club Exotica
2006 AVN Hall of Fame inductee
2006 Adam Film World Guide Award – Lifetime Achievement Award

References

American pornographic film directors
American pornographic film producers
Living people
Year of birth missing (living people)